The 2013 FIA WTCC Race of Morocco was the second round of the 2013 World Touring Car Championship season and the fourth running of the FIA WTCC Race of Morocco. It was held on 7 April 2013 at the Marrakech Street Circuit in Marrakech, Morocco.

Both races were won by first time victors in the World Touring Car Championship, race one was won by Michel Nykjær of NIKA Racing and race two was won by Pepe Oriola of Tuenti Racing Team who also became the youngest winner of a WTCC race.

Background
After the first round at Monza, RML driver Yvan Muller was leading the drivers' championship. James Nash was leading the Yokohama Independents' Trophy.

After the qualifying incident at Monza, Lukoil Lada Sport replaced Aleksei Dudukalo with series rookie Mikhail Kozlovskiy. Jean-Philippe Dayraut and the ANOME team were not on the entry list for Marrakech.

Report

Testing and free practice
A test session had been scheduled for Friday afternoon but was cancelled along with activities for the support races when heavy rain flooded the circuit, the lost half–hour session would not be replaced.

Muller led the dry first free practice session on Saturday morning with teammate Tom Chilton third, the pair separated by the Honda of Gabriele Tarquini who had set the pace earlier on. Norbert Michelisz was fourth in the independent Honda ahead of James Thompson in the leading Lada. Tom Coronel was sixth as the fastest BMW while Fernando Monje in tenth was the quickest SEAT. There were no improved times in the final minutes of the session due to yellow flags at the final hairpin brought out by Tom Boardman who had stopped on the circuit.

Muller led an RML 1–2 in the second practice session with Alex MacDowall making it three Chevrolets at the top of the times. There was a small fire on Michelisz's car in the pit lane while SEAT drivers Boardman and Robert Huff completed a limited number of laps due to car problems.

Qualifying
Qualifying was delayed by an hour as a result of the cancellation of all Friday running for the support races.

Tarquini took the first pole position for the Castrol Honda World Touring Car Team ahead of the bamboo-engineering Chevrolet of Nash. The first part of qualifying was led by Tarquini, whose teammate Tiago Monteiro brought out the red flags halfway through the session when he hit one of the walls at the second chicane. The ROAL Motorsport drivers collided towards the end of the session, Darryl O'Young had given Tom Coronel a tow to get the Dutch driver through to Q2, Coronel then got his braking wrong at turn ten and ran into the back of O'Young. Thompson collided with one of the walls on the street circuit and damaged his front left corner, although he was through to the second session he would not be able to set a time due to the damage sustained.

Tarquini spent most of Q2 at the top of timing pages, Chilton looked set to take pole position when he came across the slow moving Campos Racing car of Fernando Monje who had just left the pits. Chilton and the train of cars behind him were forced to abandon their flying laps. The grid order was therefore decided by times set earlier in the session, Tarquini was ahead of five Chevrolets with Nash second, Muller and Michel Nykjær on row two with Chilton and MacDowall on row three. The ALL-INKL.COM Münnich Motorsport cars of Huff and Marc Basseng were on row four, Pepe Oriola was ninth and Monje in tenth would start on pole position for race two. Coronel and Thompson didn't set times in Q2.

Warm-Up
Chilton led the warm–up session on Sunday morning. The red flags came out twice, firstly when Nykjær clipped the kerbs at the second chicane and stopped in the middle of the track. The second stoppage brought warm–up to an early end when Boardman appeared to suffer a brake failure, clipping the front of MacDowall's Chevrolet and colliding head–on with the barriers at the final chicane.

Boardman was later ruled out of the races as a result of the damage sustained in the warm–up crash.

Race One
Tarquini led away from pole position while Nykjær moved into second place ahead of Nash. Huff had moved up to fifth place behind Muller and eventually managed to pass the RML driver, the pair then spent the next couple of places fighting over the position. Muller eventually got ahead at the final hairpin and Huff lost more places. Chilton pulled into the pit lane on lap six due to overheating resulting for damage. Nykjær and Nash were disputing second place behind Tarquini, Nykjær was then able to pass Tarquini moments before the yellow flags came out after Monteiro crashed into one of the barriers and the safety car was deployed. Nash ignored the yellow flags and passed Tarquini for second place, he then tried to hand the position back on the main straight behind the safety car but it wasn't until the following lap when the pair swapped positions. The race resumed with two laps to go, the main battle was for the final podium spot with Muller chasing Nash. Muller made a number of attempts to take the place but Nash successfully defended the place to take his first podium finish. Up ahead Nykjær claimed his first overall victory in the WTCC ahead of Tarquini.

Race Two
Monje was on pole but was passed on the opening lap by Oriola. Monje was involved a collision with the Lada of Thompson although both cars were removed under yellow flags. Towards the end of the first lap, Huff made contact with Monje and broke his right front suspension. Monje was then out on lap two when he collided with the Lada of Thompson. The safety car came out on lap nine when Tarquini lost control of his car over the kerbs at one of the chicanes and collided with MacDowall, putting both out of the race. The race resumed on the final lap with Oriola holding off Muller and Chilton to claim his first WTCC victory and become the youngest winner and the championship's history, Nash in fourth was the independents' winner.

After the race, Monje was given a five–place grid penalty at the next race in Slovakia for his collision with Thompson.

Results

Qualifying

Bold denotes Pole position for second race.

Race 1

Bold denotes Fastest lap.

Race 2

Bold denotes Fastest lap.

Standings after the event

Drivers' Championship standings

Yokohama Independents' Trophy standings

Manufacturers' Championship standings

 Note: Only the top five positions are included for both sets of drivers' standings.

References

External links
World Touring Car Championship official website

Morocco
FIA WTCC Race of Morocco
FIA WTCC Race of Morocco